Unknown Dangers is a 1926 comedy action film directed by Grover Jones and starring Frank Merrill, Gloria Grey and Eddie Boland.

Cast
 Frank Merrill Frank Carter
 Gloria Grey as Corliss McHenry
 Eddie Boland as David Parker
 Marcin Asher	
 Emily Gerdes		
 Theodore Lorch

References

Bibliography
 Connelly, Robert B. The Silents: Silent Feature Films, 1910-36, Volume 40, Issue 2. December Press, 1998.
 Munden, Kenneth White. The American Film Institute Catalog of Motion Pictures Produced in the United States, Part 1. University of California Press, 1997.

External links
 

1926 films
1920s action comedy films
1926 comedy films
American silent feature films
American action comedy films
Silent action comedy films
American black-and-white films
Films directed by Grover Jones
1920s English-language films
1920s American films
Silent American comedy films